The Babes in the Wood is a 2002 novel by British crime-writer Ruth Rendell. It is the 19th entry in the popular Inspector Wexford series, and is set, as usual, in Kingsmarkham. In 2003, it was selected  by The New York Times as one of the top five crime novels of the year.

External links 
Curled Up With A Good Book review

2002 British novels
Novels by Ruth Rendell
Hutchinson (publisher) books
Inspector Wexford series